HNLMS Hertog Hendrik was a  (pantserschip) of the Royal Netherlands Navy. The ship was built at the Rijkswerf in Amsterdam at the start of the twentieth century. She was the first ship in the Dutch navy to be equipped with wireless communication. The ship took part in two expeditions to South Celebes and during the Spanish Civil War she performed convoy duties. During World War II she was captured by the invading German forces and converted into an anti-aircraft battery. After the war the ship was recovered and given back to the Netherlands, to be converted into an accommodation ship.

Design
Two  single turret guns provided the ship's main armament, and these were augmented by four single  guns and eight  single guns. The ship had a complement of 340 men.

Service history
Hertog Hendrik was laid down on 8 March 1901 by the Dutch Queen Mother, Emma of Waldeck and Pyrmont at the Rijkswerf in Amsterdam.

The ship was launched and christened there by, Prince Henry on 7 June 1902. She was commissioned into the Royal Netherlands Navy on 5 January 1904 and the first ship in the Dutch navy to be equipped with wireless communication. The ship left Den Helder on 9 November 1904 for the Dutch East Indies. Shortly after she had departed she send the first Dutch wireless telegram.

On 24 June 1905 Hertog Hendrik hit a coral reef near Matjidosteen while en route to the Gulf of Boni. The cruiser  made several attempts to pull the stranded ship loose, but these proved unsuccessful and were abandoned when Zeelands bollards broke. The ship was later pulled clear after her sister ship  and Japara, a ship with towing equipment from the Koninklijke Paketvaart Maatschappij, arrived and Hertog Hendriks coal, reserves and munitions were offloaded. Later that year the ship took part in two expeditions to South Celebes. The first expedition was undertaken against the lord of Boni. Armed sloops of Hertog Hendrik, Zeeland and  protected the landing of Dutch forces near Patiro on 20 July 1905.

During the second expedition on 11 September De Ruyter, Hertog Hendrik,  and two ships of the Koninklijke Paketvaart Maatschappij where engaged in operations against the lord of Loewoe an ally of the lord of Boni. An infantry battalion and a marine landing party were set ashore near Palopo and later that day the soldiers and marines took the lord's palace.

In 1910 the ship together with the cruiser  escorted another cruiser, that had hit a cliff on 31 May while en route to Surabaya. The collision caused the flooding of several compartment of the ship. Damaged as she was, Noordbrabant continued to sail without aid.

Later that year the ship undertook a cruise to Australia to show the flag.

Hertog Hendrik and Noordam deployed as auxiliary cruiser left the Netherlands on 16 February 1918 as convoy to the Dutch East Indies. They planned to take the route through the Panama Canal. North of Scotland the ships encountered a heavy storm and were forced to return to make necessary repairs. The ships arrived on 19 March in Den Helder. On 5 July that year a second attempt was made to reach the Dutch East Indies by going around Scotland and Cape of Good Hope. This time the convoy consisted of Hertog Hendrik, Tabanan deployed as auxiliary cruiser, Bengkalis deployed as coaling ship and Noordam. The convoy reached Tanjung Priok, Dutch East Indies on 27 September that year.

On 2 March 1920 she and  departed from Den Helder for a four-month journey to Asia to show the flag. They visited the ports of Singapore, Saigon, Hong Kong, Shanghai, Kobe and Manila.

On 27 March 1934 the ship entered the harbor of Den Helder. The ship and crew had just returned from gunnery practice during the first three months of 1934 in the Mediterranean Sea and 19 February the ship had made an official visit to Venice. Later that year during the Open Day of the Navy in Scheveningen the ship and crew gave a demonstration with searchlights.

During the Spanish Civil War she performed convoy duties.

World War II
In 1939 December the ship served as floating battery ship Batterijschip Vliereede off Vlieland for several weeks. In early 1940 she was laid up waiting to be scrapped.
However the floating hulk was on captured on 14 May 1940 by the invading German forces. The ship sank after being attacked by a British aircraft on 21 and 22 June 1940. The Germans decided to salvage her in October 1940 and converted her into an Anti Aircraft battery at Antwerp. The conversion lasted from 1941 to 1943 and the ship was renamed Ariadne. After the war the ship was recovered in Wilhelmshaven and given back to the Netherlands, to be converted at the Wilton-Fijenoord shipyard into an accommodation ship. On 21 October 1947 she was recommissioned and given back her initial name Hertog Hendrik. She was finally decommissioned on 27 September 1968 and stricken from the navy list on 28 August 1969.

References

1902 ships
Ships built in Amsterdam
Coastal defence ships of the Royal Netherlands Navy
Maritime incidents in June 1940
Ships sunk by British aircraft
Naval ships of the Netherlands captured by Germany during World War II
Articles containing video clips